AOJ may refer to:

 the IATA code for Aomori Airport
 Art of Jiu Jitsu, a Brazilian jiu-jitsu academy based in California
 Axis of Justice, a non-profit organization based in Los Angeles, United States

fr:Aomori#Transports